Fayakuzzaman was a Member of the 3rd National Assembly of Pakistan as a representative of East Pakistan.

Career
Fayakuzzaman was a Member of the  3rd National Assembly of Pakistan representing Faridpur-III.

References

Pakistani MNAs 1962–1965
Living people
Year of birth missing (living people)
People from Gopalganj District, Bangladesh
20th-century Bengalis
People of East Pakistan